The Red Record is the debut album from the Tri-Cities, Washington hard rock band Loudermilk.

Track listing 

 "Estrogen Oxygen Aches in the Teeth Again" - 3:43
 "California" - 4:54
 "Kreates a Presence to Blush" - 3:29
 "The Twisting" - 4:34
 "Ash to Ash" - 4:30
 "Elekt" - 3:23
 "Mai" - 4:31
 "97 Ways to Kill a Superhero" - 3:44
 "Anthema" - 4:03
 "Juin" - 3:48
 "Rock 'N' Roll and The Teenage Desperation" - 3:23
 "Goldie Ella" - 4:54
 "Juillet" - 4:33
 "Attached at the Mouth" - 2:59

References

Gosling (band) albums
2002 albums
Albums produced by Ron Aniello
DreamWorks Records albums